Sliced inverse regression (or SIR) is a tool for dimensionality reduction in the field of multivariate statistics.

In statistics, regression analysis is a method of studying the relationship between a response variable y and its input variable , which is a p-dimensional vector. There are several approaches in the category of regression. For example, parametric methods include multiple linear regression, and non-parametric methods include local smoothing.

As the number of observations needed to use local smoothing methods scales exponentially with high-dimensional data (as p grows), reducing the number of dimensions can make the operation computable. Dimensionality reduction aims to achieve this by showing only the most important dimension of the data. SIR uses the inverse regression curve, to perform a weighted principal component analysis.

Model

Given a response variable  and a (random) vector  of explanatory variables, SIR is based on the model

The model describes an ideal solution, where  depends on  only through a dimensional subspace; i.e., one can reduce the dimension of the explanatory variables from to a smaller number without losing any information.

It is assumed that this reduced vector is as informative as the original  in explaining .

The unknown  are called the effective dimension reducing directions (EDR-directions). The space that is spanned by these vectors is denoted by the effective dimension reducing space (EDR-space).

Relevant linear algebra background

Given , then , the set of all linear combinations of these vectors is called a linear subspace and is therefore a vector space.  The equation says that vectors  span , but the vectors that span space  are not unique.

The dimension of a vector space is unique, but the basis itself is not. Several bases can span the same space. Dependent vectors can still span a space, but the linear combinations of the latter are only suitable to a set of vectors lying on a straight line.

Inverse regression

Computing the inverse regression curve (IR) means instead of looking for 
, which is a curve in 

it is actually

Therefore, the centered inverse regression curve is

Inverse regression versus dimension reduction

This is a connection between the model and inverse regression.

Estimation of the EDR-directions

After having had a look at all the theoretical properties, the aim now is to estimate the EDR-directions. For that purpose, weighted principal component analyses are needed. Therefore, the eigenvectors  associated with the largest eigenvalues are the standardized EDR-directions.

Algorithm

The algorithm to estimate the EDR-directions via SIR is as follows.

1. Standardize  to

 

( can also be rewritten as

 

where .)

2.
 

3.

 

4. Calculate the estimate for :

 

5.

6. Transform the standardized EDR-directions back to the original scale. The estimates for the EDR-directions are given by:

 	

(which are not necessarily orthogonal)

References

Li, K-C. (1991) "Sliced Inverse Regression for Dimension Reduction", Journal of the American Statistical Association, 86, 316–327 Jstor
Cook, R.D. and Sanford Weisberg, S. (1991) "Sliced Inverse Regression for Dimension Reduction: Comment", Journal of the American Statistical Association, 86, 328–332 Jstor
Härdle, W. and Simar, L. (2003) Applied Multivariate Statistical Analysis,  Springer Verlag. 
Kurzfassung zur Vorlesung Mathematik II im Sommersemester 2005, A. Brandt

Regression analysis
Dimension reduction